The Roman Catholic Diocese of Coroatá is a diocese located in the city of Coroatá in the Ecclesiastical province of São Luís do Maranhão in Brazil.

History
 26 August 1977: Established as Diocese of Coroatá from the Metropolitan Archdiocese of São Luís do Maranhão

Bishops
 Bishops of Coroatá (Roman rite)
Reinaldo Ernst Enrich (Heribert) Pünder † (5 May 1978 - 16 Jan 2011) Died
Sebastião Bandeira Coêlho (16 Jan 2011–present)

Coadjutor bishop
Sebastião Bandeira Coêlho (2010-2011)

Other priest of this diocese who became bishop
José Valdeci Santos Mendes, appointed Bishop of Brejo, Maranhão in 2010

References
 GCatholic.org
 Catholic Hierarchy
 Diocese website (Portuguese)

Roman Catholic dioceses in Brazil
Christian organizations established in 1977
Coroatá, Roman Catholic Diocese of
Roman Catholic dioceses and prelatures established in the 20th century
1977 establishments in Brazil